Music of Guangdong is a synthesis of a number of local Guangdong folk music styles.

In modern times, the Chinese province of Guangdong has become known for Guangdong music (later Guangdong folk tunes), a synthesis of a number of local folk music styles (like kunqu opera), intended as an accompaniment for the region's folk operas when it arose along the Pearl River Delta in the 1920s.  It gradually evolved into a string ensemble format by the 1960s, led by the gaohu with ruan, qinqin, yangqin, sanxian, yehu, and various woodwind (including houguan or saxophone) and percussion instruments. Formerly, bowed stringed instruments such as the erxian and tiqin were used. Compositions by the noted gaohu player Lü Wencheng (吕文成, 1898–1981) remain particularly popular.

Cantonese opera is popular in Pearl River Delta.  Musical institutions in Guangdong include the Guangdong International Summer Music Festival.

Teochew music and Teochew opera is popular in Chaoshan.

Hakka music is literary and laid-back in tone, and consists entirely of five notes; many folk songs only use three notes.